Yubei District, literally meaning the north of Yu (with Yu being an abbreviation for Chongqing), is a district of Chongqing municipality, bordering Sichuan province to the north. Lianglu, which is a town administered by Yubei District, is where the Chongqing Jiangbei International Airport is located.

Administrative divisions

Climate

Government and infrastructure
The Chongqing Municipal Administration of Prisons is headquartered in Yubei District.

Economy
The restaurant chain Country Style Cooking is headquartered in Yubei District.

China Express Airlines has its headquarters on the grounds of Chongqing International Airport.

Transportation
China National Highway 210

Metro
Yubei is currently served by 3 metro lines operated by Chongqing Rail Transit:
 - Hongqihegou , Jiazhoulu, Zhengjiayuanzi, Tangjiayuanzi, Shiziping, Chongqingbei Railway, Longtousi, Tongjiayuanzi, Jinyu, Jintonglu, Yuanyang, The EXPO Garden, Cuiyun, Changfulu, Huixing, Shuanglong, Bijin, Jiangbei Airport, Jurenba
 - Hongqihegou , Huahuiyuan, Dalongshan, Guangdianyuan, Dazhulin, Kangzhuang, Lijia, Jinshansi
Line 10 -Central Park West, Central Park, Central Park East, Lushan, Yubei Square, Terminal 2 of Jiangbei Airport, Terminal 3 of Jiangbei Airport

References 

 
Districts of Chongqing